Max Alfred "Maxi" Elliott (born 10 June 1961), known by his stage name Maxi Priest, is a British reggae vocalist of Jamaican descent. He is best known for singing reggae music with an R&B influence, otherwise known as reggae fusion. He was one of the first international artists to have success in this genre, and one of the most successful reggae fusion acts of all time.

Early life
Maxi Priest was born in Lewisham, London, the second youngest of nine siblings. His parents had moved to England from Jamaica to provide more opportunity for their family and he grew up listening to gospel, reggae, R&B, and pop music. He first learned to sing in church, encouraged by his mother, who was a Pentecostal missionary.

Priest grew up listening to Jamaican artists such as Dennis Brown, John Holt, Ken Boothe and Gregory Isaacs as well as singers like Marvin Gaye, Al Green, the Beatles, Phil Collins and Frank Sinatra.

As a teenager, he lifted speaker boxes for the Jah Shaka and Negus Negast sound-systems. He was a founder member of Saxon Studio International, and it was with Saxon that Maxi began performing at neighbourhood youth clubs and house parties.

His music is sometimes closer to R&B and pop than to reggae. His cousin, Jacob Miller, a reggae icon, was the frontman in the popular reggae group Inner Circle.

Two of Priest's sons are also singers; Marvin Priest (born Marvin Cornell Elliott) and Ryan Elliott, who was in the 1990s boy band, Ultimate Kaos.

Career
Priest's musical career began with him singing on the South London reggae soundsystem Saxon Studio International, after which some independent single releases followed. His first major album, Maxi (titled Maxi Priest in the US and Canada), was released in 1988, and, along with his cover of Cat Stevens' "Wild World", established him as one of the top British reggae singers.

He is one of only two British reggae acts (along with UB40) to have an American Billboard number one: "Close to You" in 1990. A duet with Roberta Flack, "Set the Night to Music", reached the American Top Ten in 1991. His duet with Shaggy in 1996, "That Girl", was also a hit in the United States, peaking at number twenty.

In the latter half of his recording career, Priest favoured working alongside other artists, both established and up-and-coming. He has worked with Sly and Robbie, Shaggy, Beres Hammond, Jazzie B, Apache Indian, Roberta Flack, Shurwayne Winchester, Shabba Ranks, Robin Trower, and Lee Ritenour.

It was reported in some newspapers in the Birmingham area, including the Birmingham Mail on 13 March 2008, that Priest would be replacing Ali Campbell as the new lead singer of UB40, and that he had recorded a cover of Bob Marley's "I Shot the Sheriff" with the band, based on information from "an unnamed source close to the band". Priest had joined UB40 on tour in 2007, culminating in sold-out shows at the National Exhibition Centre in Solihull in December. Another local newspaper, the Express & Star that had reported that Priest would be the new UB40 frontman, included a statement from band spokesman Gerard Franklyn which contradicted the claim, stating: "Maxi is collaborating with the band to record material but he won't be the new lead singer, that will be Duncan Campbell, the brother of Ali and Robin Campbell. He will only be appearing with them for this new recording."

In 2012, Priest recorded a cover of Japanese band L'arc~en~Ciel's song "Vivid Colors" for the band's English-language tribute album.

In 2013, Priest recorded a remix version of the Hindi song "" originally sung by Arijit Singh. It was remixed by British Indian producer Rishi Rich.

His 2014 album Easy to Love entered the Billboard Top Reggae Albums Chart at number two.

Sport
Priest played for non-League football club Southall, his son Marvin's team, in March 2003 when they needed players to fulfil a fixture due to an injury crisis at the club. Southall lost 3–0 to Feltham.

Awards

Discography

Studio albums

Compilations

Singles

1980s

1990s and 2000s

As featured artist

References

External links
 Official website
 Maxi Priest at Wenig-LaMonica Associates

1961 births
English people of Jamaican descent
English reggae musicians
Converts to the Rastafari movement
20th-century Black British male singers
English Rastafarians
21st-century Black British male singers
Charisma Records artists
Virgin Records artists
Lovers rock musicians
People from Lewisham
Singers from London
Reggae fusion artists
UB40 members
Living people
Musicians from Kent
Former Pentecostals
VP Records artists
Southall F.C. players